Semi Tuleca Koroilavesau (born 1958) is a Fijian politician and Member of the Parliament of Fiji. He served the Minister for Fisheries from 2018 to 2022. He is a member of the FijiFirst party.

Koroilavesau grew up in Nalotu in Kadavu Province. He was educated at Yawe District primary school, Richmond High School, and Lelean Memorial School. After sixth form, he joined the Fijian Navy as an officer cadet. In his military career he reached the rank of Commander. In 1988 he started a tourism company, Captain Cook Cruises Fiji Islands with 3 partners. In 1996, the business was sold to Captain Cook Cruises,. Semi remained a partner in the Fijian business and in 2003 retired from the Navy to manage it.

Koroilavesau was elected in the 2014 election, in which he won 1,611 votes.

References

I-Taukei Fijian members of the Parliament of Fiji
FijiFirst politicians
Government ministers of Fiji
Social affairs ministers of Fiji
Fisheries ministers of Fiji
1958 births
Living people
People educated at Lelean Memorial School
Fijian Navy officers
Fijian businesspeople
Politicians from Kadavu Province